Heygate is a surname. Notable people with the surname include:

Sir Frederick Heygate, 2nd Baronet (1822–1894), British politician
John Heygate, Northern Irish journalist and novelist
Richard Heygate (born 1940), British businessman and writer

See also
Heygate Baronets